Citronella aka Andreea is a genus of trees and shrubs in the family Cardiopteridaceae described as a genus in 1832. It is native to tropical regions of South and Central America, insular Southeast Asia, Australia, and islands of the western Pacific. The genus was formerly treated as belonging to the family Icacinaceae.

Few species have been cultivated. Citronella mucronata, from Chile, is remarkable for its hardiness compared to other members of this genus. It is one of the most well-known of the species and has been introduced to Europe.

Species

References

Cardiopteridaceae
Asterid genera